Pakutia Union is a union of Nagarpur Upazila, Tangail District, Bangladesh. It is situated  40 km southeast of Tangail city and 64 km northwest of Dhaka, The capital of Bangladesh.

Demographics

According to Population Census 2011 performed by Bangladesh Bureau of Statistics, The total population of Pakutia union is 18,184 .There are  households 4,290 in total.

See also
 Union Councils of Tangail District

References

Populated places in Dhaka Division
Populated places in Tangail District
Unions of Nagarpur Upazila